The 1929 Giro di Lombardia was the 25th edition of the Giro di Lombardia cycle race and was held on 26 October 1929. The race started and finished in Milan. The race was won by Pietro Fossati.

General classification

References

1929
Giro di Lombardia
Giro di Lombardia